Thirukural Express is a superfast express train in India, running between Kanniyakumari in Tamil Nadu which is the southernmost tip of the Indian Subcontinent, and  in New Delhi. From December 2020, it runs with newly manufactured LHB rakes.

The train shares a common route and timetable with the Tamil Nadu Sampark Kranti Express from Hazrat Nizamuddin to Dindigul in return and from Madurai to Hazrat Nizamuddin in upward.

Origin of the name
Thirukkural is a book of verses on common ethics and morality written by Tamil Poet Thiruvalluvar. The train was named after the book, with the statue of Thiruvalluvar installed at Kanniyakumari

Timings
The 12641 Hazrat Nizzamuddin–Thirukkural Express departs Kanniyakumari every Wednesday and Friday at 19:05 IST (07:05 PM) and reaches Hazrat Nizamuddin every Friday and Sunday 18:30 IST (06:30 PM). It takes 47 hours and 30 minutes to complete journey.

12642 Kanniyakumari–Thirukkural Express departs Hazrat Nizamuddin every Monday and Saturday at 05:20 IST (05:20 AM) and reaches Kanniyakumari every Wednesday and Monday at 04:45 IST (04:45 AM). It takes 47 hours and 25  minutes to complete journey.

Coaches 
It consists of 22 LHB coach with the maximum speed of 130 kmph.

 2AC - AC two tier
 3AC - AC three tier
 SL  - Sleeper class
 PC  - Pantry car
 UR. - unreserved Coach
 Loco- Locomotive

Route
This train runs from Kanniyakumari via Nagercoil, Tirunelveli, Kovilpatti, Sattur, Virudhunagar, Madurai, Dindigul, Vriddhachalam, Viluppuram, Chengalpattu, Tambaram, Balharshah, Betul, Itarsi,  to Hazrat Nizamuddin.

Traction
The Thirukural Express is hauled by an Royapuram / Lallaguda-based WAP-7 locomotive on its entire journey.

References

External links
 http://www.indiarailinfo.com
 http://www.indianrail.gov.in

Transport in Kanyakumari
Transport in Delhi
Named passenger trains of India
Express trains in India
Rail transport in Tamil Nadu
Rail transport in Uttar Pradesh
Rail transport in Madhya Pradesh
Rail transport in Maharashtra
Rail transport in Andhra Pradesh
Rail transport in Delhi
Railway services introduced in 2002